5 Dilemma Street (Dylematu 5) is a 2007 Polish TV series directed by Grzegorz Warchoł, a spin-off of the 1983 cult Alternatywy 4.

Cast
 Magdalena Boczarska	as Katarzyna
 Leon Charewicz as Kolinski
 Monika Dryl as Agnieszka
 Bożena Dykiel as Mieczysława Engelmajer
 Julia Kamińska as Cieta
 Tomasz Karolak as Rychu
 Antoni Królikowski as 'Ostry'
 Jerzy Kryszak as Dr. Zdzislaw Kolek
 Weronika Książkiewicz as Nadia
 Witold Pyrkosz as Józef Barcelek
 Bartlomiej Świniarski as Bartek Wojtaszek
 Dariusz Toczek as Michał Barcelek
 Krzysztof Tyniec as Police Office Wojtaszek
 Wojciech Czerwiński as Police Office 'Gruszka'
 Katarzyna Paskuda as Redactor Monika

See also

 Alternatywy 4

2007 Polish television series debuts
2007 Polish television series endings
Polish comedy television series
Telewizja Polska original programming